Ram Bir Manandhar is a former State Minister for Minister of Urban Development. Manandhar was a member of 2nd Nepalese Constituent Assembly. He won Kathmandu 7 seat in 2013 Nepalese Constituent Assembly election from Communist Party of Nepal (Unified Marxist-Leninist).

Manandhar has been supporting CPN (Unified Socialist) for proportional representation votes while giving an independent candidacy from Kathmandu 7.

References

Communist Party of Nepal (Unified Marxist–Leninist) politicians
Communist Party of Nepal (Unified Socialist) politicians
Living people
Nepal MPs 2017–2022
Nepal Communist Party (NCP) politicians
Members of the 2nd Nepalese Constituent Assembly
1963 births